Qusay Abd al-Ra'uf Askar, commonly known as Qusay al-Shaykh Askar (1951) is an Iraqi-Danish novelist, poet and literary scholar. His first poetry collection was published in 1983 and his first novel in 1985, since then he has created many fictional works.

Biography 
Qusay Abd al-Ra'uf Askar was born in village of Nahr Jasim, Shatt Al-Arab District, east of Basra, Kingdom of Iraq in 1951.  His family name derived from his grandfather first name, Askar, plus a title of honor, Sheikh, since he was the first imam of the Iraqi army at the beginning of its establishment in the 1920.  He studied primary school in Shatt al-Arab and secondary school in al-Ashar, Basra. He received a BA in Arabic literature from Basra University, Department of Arabic Language, 1973–1984, and a MA in Arabic literature from Damascus University, 1984. Then he obtained PhD from the Islamic College, London, in 2004.

He taught in the secondary schools of Iraq, Morocco and Libya. Worked as a reporter for Asharq Al-Awsat newspaper, then  emigrated to Denmark from Ba'athist Iraq.  He worked as a broadcaster and program presenter for the Danish television, the Arabic section.
He taught English at Cambridge Institute in Copenhagen for five years, and Danish language in schools of Denmark for three years. He held Iraqi citizenship then became a naturalized citizen of Denmark, and settled in Hellerup, then moved to Nottingham, United Kingdom, late 2000s. In Denmark, Al-Shaykh Askar founded the Arab Writers Union of Scandinavia and was chosen to head the union.

Fiction 
Iraqi academic and literary critic, in March 2017 published a list of the 100 best Iraqi novels of the twentieth century based on his “personal perception as a result of his long work in the field of literary criticism.” He placed  three novels of Al-Shaykh Askar among them. Al-Shaykh Askar once stated that "In fact, what interests me without hesitation is Russian realism. Then I refrained from it and moved on to romanticism."

Works 
Novels:
 , 1985
 , 1986
 , 1989
 , 1991
 , 1992
 , 1993
 , 1993
 , 1995
 , 1995
 , 1995
 , 2004
 , 2010
 , 2011
 , 2013
 , 2013
 , 2013
 , 2014
 , 2016
 , 2017
 , 2018
 , 2019
 , 2019
 , 2020
 , 2021
 , 2021
 , 2021
Poetry collection:
 , 1983
 , 1985
 , 1985
 , 2002
 , 2019
Other genres:
 , short story collection
Literary studies:
 , 1988
 , 1988
 , 1988
 , 1988
 , 1988
 , 1988
 , 1988
 , 1989
 , 2007
 , 2014

References 

1951 births
University of Basrah alumni
Damascus University alumni
People from Basra Province
Naturalised citizens of Denmark
20th-century Danish novelists
20th-century Iraqi novelists
21st-century Danish novelists
21st-century Iraqi novelists
20th-century Danish poets
21st-century Danish poets
Iraqi emigrants to Denmark
Iraqi expatriates in the United Kingdom
Danish Arabic-language poets
Danish writers in Arabic
Iraqi expatriates in Libya
Iraqi expatriates in Morocco
Iraqi schoolteachers
Danish schoolteachers
Danish television presenters
Iraqi television presenters
Newspaper reporters and correspondents
Danish reporters and correspondents
Iraqi reporters and correspondents
Iraqi literary scholars
Iraqi short story writers
Science fiction writers
Living people